Amara Kaaviyam is a 1981 Indian Tamil-language film directed by Amirtham and written by A. L. Narayanan. The film stars Sivaji Ganesan, Sripriya and Madhavi. It is a remake of the 1978 Hindi film Muqaddar Ka Sikandar. The film was released on 24 April 1981.

Plot 
A young orphan gets a job working for Ramanathan (Major Sundarrajan) and quickly develops a strong attachment to his boss' daughter, Aruna (Madhavi). Ramanathan is displeased with this and fires the young boy. Saraswathi (Sukumari) meets the young boy, adopts him and names him Raja (Sivaji Ganesan). She also happens to work for Ramanathan and Raja is thrilled to meet Aruna again. At Aruna's birthday party, he's falsely accused of theft and Saraswathi is fired from her job. She dies of a heart ailment soon after but Raja promises to look after his adopted sister Lalitha (J. Lalitha). Fifteen years later, Raja is now a rich man having amassed wealth by catching smugglers and collecting the rewards out on them. Ramanathan, on the other hand, is struggling financially. Aruna still believes that Raja is a thief and wants nothing to do with him. Heartbroken over this, Raja drinks excessively and finds solace in his friendship with dancer Kanchana (Sripriya). Aruna sees his drunken behaviour as more proof of his bad character. Kanchana falls in love with Raja but realises he will always hold a torch for Aruna. Raja meets and befriends the unemployed lawyer Ananth (Jai Ganesh) and they quickly become inseparable. Ramanathan and Aruna learn that Raja has been secretly helping the family financially and grow closer to him. in light of this new closeness, Raja sets up a job for Ananth with Ramanathan. He also gains the confidence to plan to confess his love to Aruna and turns to Ananth to write the love letter as he is illiterate. Aruna misinterprets it as a love letter to her from Ananth and falls for him. Ananth, unaware of the identity of Raja's love, also falls for Aruna. Chinnadurai (Tiger Prabhakar), a criminal with a soft spot for Kanchana, hears rumours of her closeness with Raja and sets out to kill him. Lalitha's wedding is also threatened when her future in-laws learn of Raja's closeness to Kanchana. The film culminates as Raja must deal with all of his various problems at once.

Cast

Production 
Amara Kaaviyam is a remake of the 1978 Hindi film Muqaddar Ka Sikandar. Sivaji Ganesan was chosen to reprise the role originally played by Amitabh Bachchan, while his son Prabhu was to have reprised the role originally played by Amjad Khan, in what would have been his debut film. Because friends of Ganesan felt the bloodshed between these two characters would not be appreciated by the audience, Prabhu could not play the role.

Soundtrack 
The soundtrack was composed by M. S. Viswanathan, while the lyrics were penned by Kannadasan and Vaali.

References

External links 
 

1980s Tamil-language films
1981 films
Films scored by M. S. Viswanathan
Tamil remakes of Hindi films